RTL 8 is a Dutch free-to-cable television channel that was launched on 18 August 2007 replacing Tien, previously known as Talpa. RTL 8's main target audience consists of women. It broadcasts soap operas, talk shows, films and reruns of programmes from its sister RTL channels. In the mornings and late afternoons children's channel RTL Telekids is broadcasting on RTL 8. Officially RTL 8, along with all other Dutch RTL channels, is broadcasting under a Luxembourg television license. Therefore, the channel is also headquartered in Luxembourg. By doing this RTL can avoid more severe control by the Dutch media authorities, as Luxembourg does not have a strict authority that regulates its broadcasters. Dutch citizens need a subscription to a cable, satellite, IPTV, or DVB-T provider to view the channel. All providers include the channel in their base package.

History

The channel started as Talpa, later rebranded as Tien, which was launched by media tycoon John de Mol in August 2005. In 2007 John de Mol's Talpa Media assets were amalgamated with RTL Nederland. In exchange, John de Mol obtained a 26.3% share in RTL Nederland.

RTL Nederland revealed that Tien would be rebranded as RTL 8. Fons van Westerloo, director of RTL Nederland explained that the name of the new RTL channel was chosen as not to conflict with the second largest Dutch commercial television channel, SBS 6. RTL 7 got a makeover as well. RTL 8 got The Oprah Winfrey Show, As the World Turns, and the popular Dutch program Gooische Vrouwen. Furthermore, RTL 8 is going to repeat the popular programmes of the other RTL-channels, previously done by RTL 7.

On 18 August 2007 Tien ceased to exist and was taken over by RTL 8.

On 15 October 2009 RTL Nederland started simulcasting their RTL 7 and RTL 8 channels in 1080i high-definition.

Programming

Domestic
 Goede tijden, slechte tijden (reruns)

Imported
 Agatha Christie's Poirot
 The Bold and the Beautiful
 Coppers
 CSI: Crime Scene Investigation
 CSI: Miami
 ER
 The Flying Doctors
 Grey's Anatomy
 House
 The Real Housewives
 Silent Witness

Children's (RTL Telekids Block)
 The Adventures of Chuck and Friends
 Barbie Dreamtopia: The Series
 Chuggington
 Dinotrux
 Ella the Elephant
 Fireman Sam
 Florrie's Dragons
 Hello Kitty and Friends
 Lego City Adventures
 Little People
 Littlest Pet Shop: A World of Our Own
 Miss Moon
 Molang
 Monchhichis
 Musti
 My Little Pony: Friendship Is Magic
 Oggy and the Cockroaches
 Om Nom
 Piet Piraat (Belgian)
 Polly Pocket
 Robin Hood's Great Adventure
 Robocar Poli
 Strawberry Shortcake
 Super 4
 Super Wings
 Tashi
 Tee and Mo
 Thomas & Friends
 Transformers: Rescue Bots Academy
 Tumble Leaf
 The Wild Adventures of Blinky Bill
 Wissper
 Wizzy & Woppy
 Zafari
 Zigby

Teletext
RTL 8 offered a teletext service which stopped on 1 April 2017. The pages 888/889 are still available for subtitles.

Logos

References

Television channels in the Netherlands
RTL Nederland
Television channels and stations established in 2007
Women's interest channels